Decoteau may refer to:

Alex Decoteau (1887-1917), Canadian athlete
Decoteau, Edmonton, neighbourhood in Canada named for him
David DeCoteau (born 1962), American film director

See also
Descoteaux (disambiguation)